Pieter Punt (6 February 1909 – 5 July 1973) was a Dutch football defender who was part of the Netherlands team in the 1938 FIFA World Cup. He also played for DFC.

References

External links
 FIFA profile

1909 births
1973 deaths
Dutch footballers
Netherlands international footballers
Association football forwards
FC Dordrecht players
1938 FIFA World Cup players
Footballers from Dordrecht